Claudia Giovine (born 18 July 1990) is an inactive Italian tennis player.

She has won 12 singles and 26 doubles titles on tournaments of the ITF Women's Circuit.
On 9 August 2010, she reached her career-high singles ranking of world No. 257, whilst her best WTA doubles ranking is 190, achieved on 6 June 2011.

ITF Circuit finals

Singles: 21 (12 titles, 9 runner–ups)

Doubles: 51 (26 titles, 25 runner–ups)

References

External links
 
 

1990 births
Living people
People from Brindisi
Italian female tennis players
Sportspeople from the Province of Brindisi
21st-century Italian women